The Great Train Robbery is a 1941 American low-budget B-western film. It was directed by Joseph Kane and starred Bob Steele and Claire Carleton. It was remade in 1949 as The Last Bandit and again in 1952 as South Pacific Trail.

Plot
Railroad sleuth Tom Logan (Bob Steele) is on a mission to stop the unlawfulness of his criminal brother, Duke Logan (Milburn Stone). Duke's gang have stolen a train filled with gold and have taken the passengers hostage as well. Amongst the many passengers is nightclub entertainer Kay Stevens (Claire Carlton) who is looking to be rescued.

Cast

 Bob Steele as Tom Logan
 Claire Carleton as Kay Stevens
 Milburn Stone as Duke Logan
 Helen MacKellar as Mrs. Logan
 Si Jenks as Whiskers
 Monte Blue as The Super
 Hal Taliaferro as Pierce
 Jay Novello as Santos 
 Dick Wessel as Gorman 
 Lew Kelly as Dad Halliday
 Guy Usher as Barnsdale
 Yakima Canutt as Klefner
 George Guhl as Jones

See also

 Bob Steele filmography

References

External links
 
 

1941 films
1941 Western (genre) films
1940s heist films
American Western (genre) films
American black-and-white films
American heist films
Films about hostage takings
Films about train robbery
Films directed by Joseph Kane
Republic Pictures films
1940s English-language films
1940s American films